Rudolf Hiti (born 4 November 1946 in Jesenice, Yugoslavia) is a retired Slovenian ice hockey player and coach. In Slovenia he played for HK Kranjska Gora, HK Acroni Jesenice and HDD Olimpija Ljubljana, winning the Yugoslav league four times. Later he played in Italy, winning the Italian league three times with HC Bolzano, where his #13 jersey was retired. He played at 17 World Championships for Yugoslavia, which is a world record, and two Olympic Games. In 1970 he was close to signing for NHL club Chicago Blackhawks, but an injury on the first friendly game for Blackhawks prevented him from signing the contract. On 5 May 2009 he was introduced to the IIHF Hall of Fame as the second Slovene.

References

External links
 

1946 births
Living people
Bolzano HC players
HC Alleghe players
HDD Olimpija Ljubljana players
HK Acroni Jesenice players
Ice hockey players at the 1968 Winter Olympics
Ice hockey players at the 1972 Winter Olympics
Ice hockey players with retired numbers
IIHF Hall of Fame inductees
Olympic ice hockey players of Yugoslavia
Sportspeople from Jesenice, Jesenice
Slovenia men's national ice hockey team coaches
Slovenian ice hockey coaches
Slovenian ice hockey forwards
Yugoslav expatriate ice hockey people
Yugoslav expatriate sportspeople in Italy
Expatriate ice hockey players in Italy
Yugoslav ice hockey forwards